Novorossiysk Railway station is a railway station in Novorossiysk, Krasnodar Krai, Russia.

History
Novorossiysk station was opened in 1889, and in 1898 a railway passenger terminal was built. The railway station in the port of Novorossiysk was built in 1895, immediately after the arrival here of steel the path of the former at the time of the Vladikavkaz Railway. 

It was destroyed, but completely restored after the Great Patriotic war, it has not lost its unique architectural beauty and figure of merit, whereby to this day, a monument of architecture of national importance.

Trains
The trains from this station go to almost any city in Russia, although most trains go to the capital of Russia — Moscow.

 Krasnodar — Novorossiysk
 Moscow — Novorossiysk
 St.Petersburg — Novorossiysk
 Perm — Novorossiysk
 Nizhny Novgorod — Novorossiysk
 Vladikavkaz — Novorossiysk
 Samara — Novorossiysk

References

External links
 
 

Railway stations in Krasnodar Krai
Novorossiysk
Railway stations in the Russian Empire opened in 1889
Cultural heritage monuments of regional significance in Krasnodar Krai